The E.750 is a class of electric railcars of the Italian railway company Ferrovie Nord Milano.

Production
The first series was built from 1982 to 1984, and was very similar to the ALe 724 of the Ferrovie dello Stato. The second series, built from 1992 to 1993, received a new cockpit design, similar to the ALe 582 and the ALe 642 of the Ferrovie dello Stato.

Formation
The E.750 are used together with the Casaralta double-deck coaches and the Socimi coaches.

References 
 Cornolò, Giovanni (2006). Ferrovie Nord Milano in tre secoli. CRA-FNM.

External links 

E.750 (1982)

3000 V DC multiple units